Andrew Baijan Rohan (born 30 June 1948 in Iraq), an Australian politician of Assyrian descent, was a member of the New South Wales Legislative Assembly representing Smithfield for the Liberal Party from 2011 to 2015.

Early years and background
Born in Iraq, Rohan completed studies in petroleum geology at the University of Baghdad, graduating with a Bachelor of Science (Geology) in 1970 and a Master of Science (Petroleum Geology) in 1975. Migrating to Australia in 1979, he initially worked as a petroleum geologist for Robertson Research before establishing his own printing business in 1995.

Elected as a Councillor to Fairfield City Council in 2008, Rohan was President of the Smithfield branch, and Smithfield SEC of the Liberal Party between 2003 and 2011.

Political career
At the 2011 state election Rohan was elected to the normally safe Labor seat with a swing of 18.8 points and won the seat with 54.8 per cent of the two-party vote. His main opponent was the then incumbent sitting member, Ninos Khoshaba, representing Labor. Since the seat was first created in 1988, Rohan's win was the first time the seats has been held by the Liberals. Smithfield was abolished in 2015, mostly replaced by Prospect.  Rohan attempted to transfer there, but was defeated.

In August 2016 Rohan was suspended from the Liberal Party after announcing his run for Fairfield City Council as an Independent against the endorsed Liberal candidates.

References

External links
Campaign profile
Mr Andrew Baijan ROHAN, BSc(Geology), MSc(Petroleum Geology) MP – Parliament of New South Wales
Twitter Page
YouTube Channel
Picasa Photo Albums

1948 births
Australian people of Iraqi-Assyrian descent
Australian politicians of Assyrian descent
Liberal Party of Australia members of the Parliament of New South Wales
Living people
Members of the New South Wales Legislative Assembly
People of Iraqi-Assyrian descent
University of Baghdad alumni
21st-century Australian politicians